Carlos Humberto Caszely Garrido (born 5 July 1950 in Santiago, Chile) is a Chilean former footballer, nicknamed "Rey del metro cuadrado", who played as a forward.

Regarded as one of Chile's most important players, between 1969 and 1985, Caszely won 48 caps and scored 29 goals for the Chile national team, including participations in the 1974 and 1982 World Cups.

Club career
Cazsely played for several football teams in his career, including Colo-Colo (1968–1973), Levante UD (1973–1974), RCD Espanyol (1974–1978), finally returning to Colo-Colo (1978–1985). He ended his career with Barcelona SC in 1986.

International career
During the opening 1974 FIFA World Cup match against West Germany, Caszely was given a red card by the match referee, Doğan Babacan, becoming the first player to be sent off in this manner. Red and yellow cards had already been introduced in the past World Cup (1970). In the 1982 World Cup he missed a penalty against Austria. In June 1976, Caszely played for the national team of Catalonia in a friendly against the Soviet Union, providing an assist to Johan Neeskens.

Political views
He was revered by many Chileans as a supporter of the left under the Pinochet dictatorship and as one of the few leading Chilean footballers to declare his opposition to the regime.

Outside football
In the 1970s, he studied Physical Education at the University of Chile.

Today he works as a host for several sport related TV shows on Canal 13, a Chilean-based TV station and plays football at amateur level for a team called "Colo-Colo 1973", composed of former Colo-Colo players.

In the 1990s, he finished his second Bachelor of Arts at the University of Santiago, Chile, where he studied journalism.

Participation in the World Cup

Honours

Club
Colo Colo
 Primera División de Chile (5): 1970, 1972, 1979, 1981, 1983
 Copa Chile (3): 1981, 1982, 1985

Individual
Chilean League's Top Scorer: 1979, 1980, 1981
 1973 Copa Libertadores: Top Scorer
 Best player in 1979 Copa América
 2009 Award of CONMEBOL by exalt to South American soccer

References

External links 

 Player profile 
 

1950 births
Living people
Chilean people of Hungarian descent
Footballers from Santiago
Chilean footballers
Chilean expatriate footballers
Chile international footballers
Association football forwards
1974 FIFA World Cup players
1982 FIFA World Cup players
1979 Copa América players
Segunda División players
Tercera División players
Levante UD footballers
La Liga players
RCD Espanyol footballers
Chilean Primera División players
Colo-Colo footballers
Ecuadorian Serie A players
Barcelona S.C. footballers
Expatriate footballers in Spain
Expatriate footballers in Ecuador
Chilean expatriate sportspeople in Spain
Chilean expatriate sportspeople in Ecuador
Naturalised citizens of Spain
Catalonia international guest footballers
University of Chile alumni
University of Santiago, Chile alumni
University of Navarra alumni
Chilean sports journalists
Chilean journalists